The International Foundation for Electoral Systems (IFES) is an international, non-profit organization founded in 1987. Based in Arlington, Virginia, the organization assists and supports elections and electoral stakeholders in new and emerging democracies. Since 1987, IFES has worked in 145 countries and has programs in more than 50 countries throughout Asia-Pacific, Africa, Eurasia, the Middle East, and North Africa, and the Americas.

IFES is a non-governmental organization registered as a 501(c)(3) in the United States. According to IFES, they work to advance good governance and democratic rights by providing technical assistance to election officials, collaborating with civil society and public institutions to increase participation in the political process, and applying field-based research to improve the electoral cycle and develop trusted electoral bodies. IFES is supervised by a board of directors made up of Democrat and Republican politicians and members of the international community. Since 2018, the president of IFES is Anthony Banbury, having replaced Bill Sweeney.

History
IFES was founded by F. Clifton White on September 19, 1987, as a response to Ronald Reagan's 1982 Westminster speech, in which he stressed the importance of promoting democracy. IFES was established along with other United States federal-government-funded organizations claiming to focus on democracy promotion, including the National Endowment for Democracy (NED), the National Democratic Institute for International Affairs (NDI), and the International Republican Institute (IRI), all established in 1983.

Major events

In 1989, IFES began its first project, which focused on the Paraguayan general elections of that year.

By 1990, IFES had established its first field office in Haiti.

In 1991, IFES convened a conference that established the Association of Central and Eastern European Election Officials (ACEEEO), its first cooperative agreement with USAID, and opened a new Resource Center.

In 1995, IFES embarked on a joint venture with International Republican Institute and the National Democratic Institute for International Affairs to create the Consortium for Elections and Political Process Strengthening (CEPPS). This is a cooperative agreement supervised by the United States Agency for International Development (USAID) Office of Democracy and Governance, which is the principal contractor for the Office of Democracy and Government's elections and political processes program which provides technical assistance and support to USAID missions worldwide.

In 1995, IFES also accomplished its first surveys in Russia and Ukraine. The first IFES-created non-government organization, CENTRAS, also became private at this time as a continuation of the IFES's "Civic Voice" project in Romania.

In 1996, IFES received its first international appointment from Organization for Security and Co-operation in Europe (OSCE: Bosnia and Herzegovina) and, in 1997, worked with the Association of Caribbean Electoral Organizations (ACEO) to adopt the San Juan Declaration which is IFES' first disability effort.

In 1998, IFES partnered up with International IDEA and UNDESA, with funding from USAID, to release the Administration and Cost of Elections Project. ACE became one of the most valued and best-known international depositories of knowledge on managing elections focused on the administrative and cost implications of the choices available. In 2006 the name was changed to the ACE Electoral Knowledge Network (with the letters ACE no longer standing for Administration and Cost of Elections) and launched a new online knowledge repository that provides information and advice on improving elections and the elections process.

In 1998, IFES also opened its first field office in Asia located in the Philippines.

In 1999, as part of its youth and elections programs, IFES introduced a 10-day Summer Democracy Camp for middle and high school students. The Democracy Camps teach youngsters about democracy and how to participate in the political process. The first Democracy Camp program was in Uzbekistan during the summer of 1999.

In 2002, IFES worked on its first-ever domestic projects which focused on the 2002 Florida Elections.

In 2002, voters with disabilities were able to use IFES' Tactile Ballot Guide in Sierra Leone's May 2002 presidential and parliamentary elections. This was the first time in Africa that the visually impaired were able to cast their ballots unassisted and in secret.

In 2003, IFES acquired The Center for Democracy, an organization founded in 1985 by Allen Weinstein.

In 2005, IFES established the Charles T. Manatt Democracy Awards to pay tribute to outstanding men and women who are committed to freedom and democracy, just like Ambassador Manatt. IFES awards three individuals each year: one Democrat, one Republican, and a member of the international community to highlight the fact that democracy work transcends political barriers and national borders.

As part of IFES' 20th anniversary, in 2007, it hosted the fourth Global Electoral Organization Conference (GEO Conference) in Washington. This conference brought together 200 election officials and democracy advocates from 67 countries to discuss the most pressing issues in the field of election administration.

With global attention on the 2016 U.S. presidential election, IFES gathered 550 participants from 90 countries for the 2016 U.S. Election Program and Seventh Global Elections Organization Conference (GEO-7) from November 6–10. The 2016 USEP and GEO-7 was the largest international gathering of election professionals of the year and the 13th hosted by IFES since 1992. The event brought together election officials, parliamentarians and diplomats from around the world to observe and learn about the U.S. electoral system as well as discuss elections and voting from comparative international perspectives.

Prize 
IFES gives two annual awards: the Joe C. Baxter Award and the Charles T. Manatt Democracy Award.

Leadership

Executive
 Anthony Banbury, President/CEO
 Michael Meenan, Chief Financial Officer
 Catherine Barnes, Vice President, Global Growth and Outreach
 Michael Svetlik, Vice President, Programs
 Chad Vickery, Vice President, Global Strategy and Technical Leadership
 Elaine Cole, Director, Human Resources

Board of Directors

 Thomas A. Devine, Chairman
 Amb. J. Kenneth Blackwell, Co-Chairman
 June Langston DeHart, Vice-Chair
 Amb. William C. Eacho, Vice-Chair
 Amb. Theodore Sedgwick, Treasurer
 Randal Teague Sr., Secretary
 Margaret Biggs
 Garvin Brown
 Kenneth Cutshaw
 Charles Dolan Jr.
 Hon. Irene Hadžiabdić
 Hon. Steny Hoyer
 Frederick S. Humphries Jr.
 William J. Hybl
 Attahiru Muhammadu Jega
 Gregori Lebedev
 Amb. Tom McDonald
 M. Peter McPherson
 H.E. Andrés Pastrana
 Hon. Rob Portman
 Daniel F. Runde
 Camille Stewart
 Donald R. Sweitzer
 Sarah Tinsley

Funding
IFES receives funding from the following donors (among others) as listed on its website:

U.S. Government
United States Agency for International Development
United States Department of State

Bilateral Donors
AusAID (Australia)
Global Affairs Canada (Canada)
Department for International Development (United Kingdom)
Finnish Ministry for Foreign Affairs
Norwegian Royal Ministry of Foreign Affairs (Norway)
SIDA (Sweden)

Multilateral Donors
Organization for Security and Co-operation in Europe
United Nations, UNDP, and other UN agencies
IFES also partners with international and domestic organizations around the world to advance good governance and democratic rights.

Activities by region

Sub-Saharan Africa

IFES has worked in over 20 countries in Sub-Saharan Africa over the past three decades.

Currently, IFES has programs in Burkina Faso, Ethiopia, Kenya, Mali, Niger, Nigeria and Senegal.

IFES lent significant support to the development of the Association of African Election Authorities.

The Americas

IFES has been developing and implementing programs in the Americas region since its foundation, in 1987.

Currently, IFES has programs in Ecuador, El Salvador, Guatemala, Haiti, Honduras, Jamaica and Nicaragua.

Asia-Pacific

Over the last three decades, IFES has engaged in programming and research across Asia-Pacific, partnering global expertise with local solutions through combining efforts with a variety of partner organizations. 

Currently, IFES has programs in Bangladesh, Cambodia, Fiji, Indonesia, Maldives, Mekong Region, Myanmar, Nepal, Pacific Islands, Pakistan, Papua New Guinea, Sri Lanka and Timor-Leste.

Europe and Eurasia

Across Europe and Eurasia, IFES states that it applies its technical expertise in an effort to advance good governance and democratic rights. IFES has had a long-term presence in many countries in Europe, such as Ukraine – where IFES has regularly conducted public opinion surveys since 1994 – and continues to conduct programming in diverse environments in countries such as Georgia and Kyrgyzstan.

Currently, as of 2023, IFES activities are running in Albania, Belarus, Bosnia and Herzegovina, Bulgaria, Kosovo, Montenegro, and Romania, with regional field offices in Armenia, Georgia, Kyrgyzstan, North Macedonia, Serbia, Ukraine, and Uzbekistan.

Middle East and North Africa
IFES has worked in over a dozen countries throughout the Middle East and North Africa.

Currently, as of 2023, IFES runs activities in Lebanon and Syria, with regional field offices in Iraq, Libya, Sudan, and Tunisia.

References

Bibliography 
 Found at Google Books
 Found at Google books
 Found at Google Books
  Found at Google Books

External links
 

International nongovernmental organizations
Election and voting-related organizations
Development charities based in the United States
Charities based in Washington, D.C.
Organizations established in 1987
United States Agency for International Development
1987 establishments in the United States